Mabel Wharekawa-Burt  is a New Zealand Māori film and television actress and community leader.

Biography 
Wharekawa-Burt was raised in Katikati, in New Zealand's Bay of Plenty, by her aunt and uncle as a whāngai adoption. Her home marae is Te Rereatukahia Marae. She attended Katikati College and was the first Māori student to serve as a prefect. 

She has appeared in several feature films, including Whale Rider, In My Father's Den, Jubilee and Merry Christmas Mr Lawrence. She has also appeared in television programmes such as Shortland Street and Mataku.

Recognition 
In the 2009 New Year Honours, Wharekawa-Burt was appointed a Member of the New Zealand Order of Merit, for services to the performing arts and the community.

In October 2019, Wharekawa-Burt was inducted into the hall of fame at the inaugural Vaine Rangatira awards for Cook Islands women.

References

External links
 

21st-century New Zealand actresses
New Zealand television actresses
New Zealand film actresses
Living people
Year of birth missing (living people)
Members of the New Zealand Order of Merit
People from Katikati